Carlos Eduardo Ocariz Guerra (born 1971, Caracas) is a Venezuelan politician and engineer. He was the mayor and former deputy of Sucre Municipality in east Caracas. Ocariz is a member of Justice First. On 22 February 2012, he announced he planned to run for the office of Governor of the state of Miranda after then Governor Henrique Capriles Radonski was announced as the opposition candidate against President Hugo Chávez in the 2012 presidential elections.

External links 
 Ocariz biography in Spanish
 Carlos Ocariz wins in Sucre (The Economist)

1971 births
Living people
Mayors of places in Venezuela
Justice First politicians
Venezuelan engineers
Universidad Metropolitana alumni